Kiddush, literally, "sanctification", is a blessing recited over wine or grape juice to sanctify the Shabbat and Jewish holidays. Additionally, the word refers to a small repast held on Shabbat or festival mornings after the prayer services and before the meal.

Significance
The Torah refers to two requirements concerning Shabbat – to "keep it" and to "remember it" (shamor and zakhor). Jewish law therefore requires that Shabbat be observed in two respects. One must "keep it" by refraining from thirty-nine forbidden activities, and one must "remember it" by making special arrangements for the day, and specifically through the kiddush ceremony.

Reciting kiddush before the meal on the eve of Shabbat and Jewish holidays is thus a commandment from the Torah (as it is explained by the Oral Torah). Reciting kiddush before the morning meal on Shabbat and holidays is a requirement of rabbinic origin. Kiddush is not usually recited at the third meal on Shabbat, although Maimonides was of the opinion that wine should be drunk at this meal as well.

Rituals

To honor the mitzvah of reciting kiddush, a silver goblet is often used, although any cup can suffice. The cup must hold a revi'it of liquid. After the person reciting the kiddush drinks from the wine, the rest of it is passed around the table or poured out into small cups for the other participants. Alternatively, wine is poured for each of the participants before kiddush.

Before reciting kiddush, the challah, which will be the next food item eaten in honor of the Shabbat or holiday, is first covered with a cloth. According to Halakha, the blessing over bread takes precedence to the blessing over wine. However, in the interests of beginning the meal with kiddush, the challah is covered to "remove" it from the table (some do not have the challah on the table at all during kiddush).

Wine or grape juice may be used for kiddush. The Talmud permits the use of unfermented fresh grape juice for sacramental use. While later legal codes have expressed a preference for wine, traditional and orthodox communities generally permit the use of grape juice in place of wine for blessings and rituals.

On Friday night kiddush may be recited over the challah; the blessing over bread is substituted for the blessing over wine. In that case, the ritual hand-washing normally performed prior to consuming the challah is done before the recitation of kiddush. German Jews follow this procedure even if wine is present. If there is only sufficient wine or grape juice for one kiddush, it should be used for the Friday night kiddush.

In many synagogues, kiddush is recited on Friday night at the end of services. This kiddush  does not take the place of the obligation to recite kiddush at the Friday night meal. When recited in a synagogue, the first paragraph (Genesis 2:1–3) is omitted.

The text of the Friday night kiddush begins with a passage from Genesis 2:1–3, as a testimony to God's creation of the world and cessation of work on the seventh day. Some people stand during the recital of these Biblical verses (even if they sit for kiddush), since according to Jewish law testimony must be given standing.

There are different customs regarding sitting or standing while reciting kiddush depending on communal and family tradition.

Some Hasidic and Sephardic Jews pour small amounts of water into the wine before kiddush on Friday night. This is done either to commemorate the old custom of "mixing of the wine" in the days when wine was too strong to be drunk without dilution, or to infuse the water (wine?) with the quality of mercy which is symbolized by water (wine?).

Since the Shabbat morning kiddush is rabbinically rather than biblically mandated, it has a lesser status than the Friday night kiddush. Its name Kiddusha Rabba (קידושא רבא, "The Great Kiddush"), first mentioned in the Talmud, is euphemistic. There are different versions for the kiddush on Sabbath morning, and it is generally shorter than the Friday night kiddush. Originally, this kiddush consisted only of the blessing over the wine. Later, additional verses related to Shabbat were added. However, there are a wide variety of customs as to which verse are recited, and in some liberal congregations no verses at all are recited.

Text

Other variations
On Rosh Hashanah, the night Kiddush is similar to that of the other festivals. Where it differs, it is usually to follow the pattern of middle blessing of the Amidah. (An example is the concluding formula "Blessed are You, the LORD, King over the entire world, Who sanctifies [the Sabbath,] Israel, and the Day of Remembrance.") During the day, the verses Psalms 81:4–5 (Ashkenazi) or Numbers 10:10 (Sephardic) are recited prior to the blessing over wine. Many also say the festival verses (usually first), and on Shabbat all recite the relevant verses (see above) at the very beginning.

On Yom Kippur, being a fast day, no kiddush is recited, even by one who will be eating for medical reasons, and even on Shabbat.

Yaknehaz
When a festival is on Saturday night, Kiddush is recited, but Havdalah must also be said because Shabbat is holier than the festivals. The sequence of blessings in such a case is known as yak'n'haz (יקנה"ז), for yayin, kiddush, ner, havdalah, zman, meaning "wine, kiddush, flame, havdalah, shehecheyanu". That is, first the blessing over wine, then the standard kiddush blessing (see above), then the blessing for the flame (borei m'orei ha'eish, Who creates the radiance of the fire), then a modified havdalah blessing (ending with "Who differentiates between (one level of) holiness and (another level of) holiness"), and then the shehecheyanu blessing (omitted on the final days of Passover; see above). Essentially, the havdalah blessings are recited after kiddush, but before shehechiyanu, which is usually the last blessing to ever be recited. Spices are not used.

In the opposite case, when Shabbat follows a festival, the regular Shabbat kiddush is recited, with no variations.

Yaknehaz Candle
While on a year-round Motzai Shabbat one can extinguish the candle used for Havdalah, this is not permitted when the evening coincides with a Holiday date (Yom Tov). Rather than simply picking up two of the candles already lit for Yom Tov when the blessing for fire is recited as part of a modified Havdalah, and holding them so that their wicks are interlaced, it is easier to use a special two-wick candle as one of the Holiday candles; they're sized to fit in a regular Shabbat candelabra or candlestick holder (in place of a standard one-wick candle).

This special candle is called a Yaknehaz Candle.

Synagogue kiddush
The term kiddush  also refers to refreshments served either at home or at the synagogue following prayer services on Shabbat or Yom Tov, which begin with the recitation of kiddush. Cake, crackers, and gefilte fish are traditionally served. On Shavuot morning, the custom is to serve dairy foods such as cheesecake and cheese blintzes for the kiddush.

According to the Shulchan Aruch, kiddush should be recited preceding the Shabbat meal. Eating mezonot such as cake or cookies or drinking an additional revi'it of wine is also sufficient according to the opinion of most Rishonim.  Nevertheless, some Jews recite kiddush only when about to partake of a full meal.

Often a kiddush is hosted by a family celebrating the birth of a daughter, a bar mitzvah, a wedding, an engagement, a birthday, or other happy occasion. Some people also host a kiddush on the yahrtzeit of a parent or other relative. In some synagogues the celebrant is honored with reciting the Shabbat morning kiddush on behalf of all the attendees. In other synagogues the rabbi or gabbai recites the kiddush. Some Jews make kiddush on Shabbat morning over liquor instead of wine. When this is done, the blessing recited is she-hakol nihyeh bid'varo instead of borei p'ri ha-gafen. The Mishnah Berurah (an authoritative Ashkenazi halakhic text) rules that under extenuating circumstances, liquor may be substituted for wine on the grounds that it is  Hamar Medina,  a drink one would serve to a respected guest; nevertheless, many rely on this even without extenuating circumstances.

History of using white wine 
During the 17th century, because of blood libels, David HaLevi Segal "issued a Passover ruling ... that the traditional red wine used at the Seders be substituted with white wine in lands of persecution in order to not arouse suspicion."

See also
 Kosher wine

References

External links
Jewish Encyclopedia: Kiddush
Chabad.org: Kiddush

Jewish ceremonial food and drink
Jewish prayer and ritual texts
Jewish blessings
Shabbat
Positive Mitzvoth
Judaism and alcohol
Hebrew words and phrases in Jewish prayers and blessings